Iron boy can refer to:
 Iván Calderón (boxer), born 1975, Puerto Rican boxer
 Järnpojke, a statue in Old Town, Stockholm, Sweden